Oakland Township is the name of some places in the U.S. state of Minnesota:
Oakland Township, Freeborn County, Minnesota
Oakland Township, Mahnomen County, Minnesota

See also

Oakland Township (disambiguation)

Minnesota township disambiguation pages